Lee Conklin is an artist best known for his psychedelic  poster art of the late 1960s, and his iconic album cover for Santana's debut album.

Conklin was born in Englewood Cliffs, New Jersey in 1941 and graduated from Spring Valley High School in New York in 1959. He attended Calvin College in Grand Rapids, Michigan. He worked as a cartoonist for the college newspaper. He was married in 1965. He served in the United States Army and was stationed in South Korea as a cook, where he painted murals on mess halls. He was discharged from the Army in May 1967. He moved to San Francisco began creating concert posters for the growing music scene from 1968 to 1970. He moved to New York in 1972, working at various jobs to support his family. Conklin returned to creating art full-time in 1990. He currently lives in Central California with his wife.

Works
He has created numerous posters for the band Moonalice.

References

External links
Conklin at Allmusic.com

1941 births
Living people
Artists from California
Music of the San Francisco Bay Area
People from Englewood Cliffs, New Jersey
Artists from New Jersey
Calvin University alumni
Album-cover and concert-poster artists
United States Army soldiers